Melchor Cano (1509? – 30 September 1560) was a Spanish Scholastic theologian.

Clerical life
He was born in Tarancón, New Castile, and joined the Dominican Order in Salamanca, where by 1546 he had succeeded Francisco de Vitoria to the theological chair in the university.  A man of deep learning and originality, proud and a victim to the odium theologicum. His only rival was the gentle Bartolomé Carranza, also a Dominican and afterwards archbishop of Toledo. At the university the schools were divided between the partisans of the two professors; Cano pursued his rival with relentless virulence, and took part in the condemnation for heresy of his brother-friar. The new society of the Jesuits, also met with his violent opposition; and he was not grateful to them when, after attending the Council of Trent in 1545, he was sent, by their influence, in 1552, as bishop of the far-off see of the Canary Islands.

Consultatio theologica
His personal influence with King Philip II of Spain soon brought about his recall, and he was made provincial of his order in Castile. In 1556 he wrote his famous Consultatio theologica, in which he advised the king to resist the temporal encroachments of the papacy and, as absolute monarch, to defend his rights by bringing about a radical change in the administration of ecclesiastical revenues, thus making Spain less dependent on Rome. With this in his mind Pope Paul IV styled him "a son of perdition."

De Locis theologicis

The reputation of Cano rests on a posthumous work, De Locis theologicis (Salamanca, 1562), unrivalled in its own line. In this, a genuine work of the Renaissance, Cano tried to free dogmatic theology from the vain subtleties of the schools; by clearing away the puerilities of the later scholastic theologians, to bring religion back to first principles; and, by giving rules, method, co-ordination and system, to build up a scientific treatment of theology. In discussing the credibility of sources, he was one of the first to inquire into the principles of the credibility of historical documents. He argues that if all serious historians agree about a fact, then we should believe it, even if it is unlikely. Otherwise "It would be as if the Mediterranean peoples were to deny the existence of the ocean ... or if, indeed, we should mock at him who speaks of elephants."

References

 Text of the Salamanca edition is to be found in Migne I, 1837, 78, 908.
 J. Franklin, The Science of Conjecture: Evidence and Probability Before Pascal (Baltimore: Johns Hopkins University Press, 2001), 192-3.

External links
Speculative and Practical Theology in the Second Scholasticism: Melchor Cano (c. 1507–1560)
De Locis Theologicis (Latin Text)

1500s births
1560 deaths
Spanish Dominicans
16th-century Spanish Roman Catholic theologians
Participants in the Council of Trent
16th-century male writers
University of Salamanca alumni
Academic staff of the University of Salamanca
School of Salamanca
16th-century Spanish philosophers